The Beth Israel Synagogue in Brasov (Hebrew: בית ישראל), a neological synagogue in the vernacular language, stands at 29 Poarta Șchei Street in the center of Brasov, Romania, behind the street front, on a plot surrounded by houses. The synagogue still plays a ritual role. The building complex includes a community seat and a kosher restaurant. Beth Israel Synagogue is included in the list of National Historic monuments in Romania under the number BV-II-m-B-11515.

History 
Although practitioners of Judaism had lived in Brașov as early as the 15th century, they did not receive an official settlement permit until 1807. The Brașov Jewish community, which initially comprised four families, was formed in 1826. They initially used the Chapel Street Hospital, established by Saxon Lutherans, as a religious building. The prayer house relocated to the Lakatos-Zwinger area (where the museum is today), and a school was established. From 1856, the community's house of worship was in the Joiner-Zwinger, at the site of the later reformed church (where the Aro Palace stands today).

Brașov was the first Saxon city in which Jewish merchants also played a role: They wrote a petition which later allowed Jews to settle in other cities in Transylvania.

After 1868, the community became neologic. In 1877, it split into an innovative neologist faction led by Aronsohn Löbl and a nationalist orthodox group led by Adler Bernhard. Each community built its own prayer house. The Neology Synagogue was built between 1899 and 1901, at 29 Orphanage Street, according to the plans of architect Lipót Baumhorn. It cost 1.2 million crowns to build, more than the magnificent Szeged Synagogue. Rabbi Ludovic Pap-Rosenberg inaugurated the synagogue on August 20, 1901. Hundreds of soldiers were deployed to maintain order during the ceremony because of the blood blazing charge.

During the first four decades of the 20th century, the city's Jewish community more than quadrupled to 3,494. In 1912, an organization was set up to envision the future of Jewry in Argentina. In 1921, a Jewish sports association was founded under the name Ivria, and soon another was founded under the name Hakoach.

In November 1940, Iron Guards damaged the synagogue, smashing the stained glass, furniture, and organ. During World War II, the building was used as a gym. After the war, it was renovated, and in 1949 the Neologist and Orthodox factions reunited. After the establishment of the State of Israel, the majority of the Jews in Brasov emigrated.

In 2001, on the centenary of its opening, the synagogue was renovated again. Because the community had become more orthodox, the bane was moved to the center of the main ship by moving the benches and cutting them back. In August 2014, a monument was unveiled in the courtyard to commemorate the Transylvanian victims of the Holocaust. In October 2014, the synagogue was renamed Beth Israel (House of Israel). The community currently has about 225 members and the cemetery is on Crișan Street.

Description 

The  synagogue is built in a three-nave Neo-Gothic style with Moorish elements. Stained-glass windows show the coat of arms of 32 Israeli settlements. The facade's windows emit sunlight, and the top of the roof represents the stone tablet of the Ten Commandments. Memorial plaques in the lobby list the names of the presidents of the Jewish community and the Jews from Brasov who died during World War II. The main nave is separated by rows of columns from the aisles; these pillars have balconies where women can sit. The synagogue is open Monday through Friday; an entrance fee is required.

The building complex, at 27 Orava House, includes a community headquarters, kosher restaurant, medical office, and aid organization.

Gallery

References

Sources 

Neolog Judaism synagogues
Synagogues in Romania
Historic monuments in Brașov County
Religious buildings and structures in Brașov
Synagogues completed in 1901